Jürgen Degenhardt, real name Hans-Jürgen Degenhardt, (21 October 1930 in Dresden – 1 August 2014) was a German songwriter, actor, director and author. He was considered the most successful German writer of musical comedies.

On 1 August 2014 he died of cancer in Erfurt.

Filmography 
 1955: Hotelboy Ed Martin
 1957: Polonia-Express
 1958: Geschwader Fledermaus

Theatre 
 1953: Roger Vailland: Colonel Foster ist schuldig – director: Herwart Grosse/Wolfgang Langhoff (Deutsches Theater Berlin – Kammerspiele)
 1953: Julius Hays: Der Putenhirt (Otto) – director: Fritz Wendel (Deutsches Theater Berlin – Kammerspiele)
 1956: Peter Hacks: Eröffnung des indischen Zeitalters – director: Ernst Kahler (Deutsches Theater Berlin)

References

External links 
Kurzbiografie mit Werkverzeichnis
 
 

1930 births
2014 deaths
Writers from Dresden
German musical theatre librettists
German lyricists
German male film actors
German male musical theatre actors
Deaths from cancer in Germany